Helonastes rubelineola is a moth in the family Crambidae. It was described by Wang and Sung in 1981. It is found in China (Anhui, Jiangxi, Guangdong).

References

Moths described in 1981
Schoenobiinae